Fausto Tinelli (1959–1978) and Lorenzo "Iaio" Iannucci (1959–1978), two young Italian left-wing activists, were shot dead after a street confrontation in Milan during the Years of Lead. Nobody has ever been convicted for their deaths and the official investigation was closed in 2000. Various theories have been suggested for the double murder, involving the neo-fascist underground, the Italian intelligence agencies, the kidnapping of Aldo Moro and local drug dealers.

Background

Fausto Tinelli was born on 25 November 1959 in Trento. When he was a child, his parents moved to the district of Casoretto in Milan. After school he studied first mechanical engineering then fine art. He was politically left-wing, sympathetic to Lotta Continua but not a fully fledged participant. He became friends with Lorenzo Iannucci, known as Iaio, when they were children playing at the local oratory. Iannucci was born on 29 September 1959 in Telese, in the province of Benevento and also moved to Milan as a child. When they were older, the two frequented Centro Sociale Leoncavallo, a self-managed social centre and bonded through their mutual love of music and reading. Iannucci worked as a labourer. Together the two men participated in the research for a report into the local heroin trade.

Italy in this time was experiencing the Years of Lead, in which various left-wing and right-wing groups were fighting in the streets. Twelve days before the double murder, neofascist Franco Anselmi had been shot dead whilst robbing a gun shop in Rome. Just two days earlier, former prime minister Aldo Moro had been kidnapped by the Red Brigades.

Double murder

On 18 March 1978, Tinelli and Iannucci (commonly known as Fausto and Iaio) had been spending time together in Casoretto. They were planning to eat dinner at Tinelli's house and then go to a concert at Leoncavallo. Between 19:30 and 20:00, they passed the corner of via Casoretto and via Mancinelli, where they encountered three other men. Witnesses reported hearing muffled shots and both Iannucci and Tinelli fell to the ground; the former died immediately and the latter died after being rushed to hospital.

The three assailants ran away on foot, one of them losing a blue hat. One of them had fired a gun hidden in a plastic bag in order to not leave any used cartridges behind. In the days following the double assassination, there was a vigil at the site and a demonstration of between 100,000 and 300,000 people. Four far-right groups claimed responsibility for the killings.

Theories on murderers 

Nobody has ever been convicted for the crime and there are different theories about the identity of the perpetrators. One of the groups claiming responsibility was the Revolutionary National Army, Brigata combattente Franco Anselmi, which referenced the death of Anselmi days before. The investigation was formally ended by Judge Clementina Forleo in 2000. She said there was considerable evidence against , Carminati and Corsi, but not enough to convict them. Another line of enquiry is that Iannucci and Tinelli were killed because they were compiling a report about heroin selling in the local area. The murders have also been linked to the kidnapping of Moro, since it was later discovered that the Red Brigades had a safe house close to Tinelli's home. In 2011, Tinelli's mother told the mainstream media that she blamed the 
Italian intelligence agencies for her son's murder, because the third floor flat in the building where the family lived had been used by a security agency to monitor the Red Brigades apartment and she thought she and her son had been put under surveillance.

Legacy 

Journalist  wrote a book about the murders entitled Fausto e Iaio: La speranza muore a diciotto anni.  The association Familiari e Amici di Fausto e Iaio campaigned for gardens in Milan to be named after the two men and in 2012, the gardens of Piazza Durante were dedicated to them. There was also an attempt to unofficially rename the road where the men were murdered to via Fausto e Iaio.

The play Viva L'Italia. Le morti di Fausto e Iaio (Long live Italy.

References

External links
 Memorial website

1978 deaths
Years of Lead (Italy)
1970s in Milan
People from Benevento
People from Trento
People from Milan
Unsolved murders in Italy
Deaths by firearm